

Surname
Ostrogorsky is a surname. Notable people with the surname include:

George Ostrogorsky (1902–1976), Russian-born Yugoslavian historian and Byzantinist
Moisey Ostrogorsky (1854–1921), Belarusian political scientist, historian, jurist and sociologist

Others

Moisey Ostrogorsky unwittingly donated his surname to the Ostrogorski Centre, which is a "Western-style" political lobby group.